Bhumika Shrestha (Nepali: भूमिका श्रेष्ठ, born January 11, 1988, in Kathmandu, Nepal) is a Nepalese activist and actor. Shrestha is a third gender activist and is currently working with the Blue Diamond Society.

Personal life 
Shrestha was born on January 11, 1988, in Kathmandu, Nepal. Shrestha was assigned male but does not identify as either a man or a woman; rather, Shrestha prefers to identify as "third gender".

Awards 
In 2022, Shrestha received the International Women of Courage Award from the United States Department of State.

Filmography

Actor 
 Highway (2012)
 Kanchhi (2018)

Self 
 Other Nature as Self (2010) (Documentary film)
 Beauty and Brains (2010) (Documentary film)
 Le monde en face (2014) (TV Series – Episode Global Gay)
 Out & Around (2015) (Documentary film)

Bibliography 
 Bhumika,  (2019)

References

External links 
 

Nepalese human rights activists
Living people
1988 births
Nepalese social workers
21st-century Nepalese actors
Actors from Kathmandu
Third gender
Nepalese LGBT people
21st-century LGBT people
Recipients of the International Women of Courage Award
Nepalese film actors